Gegar (THR Gegar) is a Malaysian Malay language radio station operated by Astro Radio Sdn. Bhd. The radio station targets East Coast Peninsular listeners and plays music from local artists, as well as some Islamic-related content. In late 2017, the former THR Gegar is rated as the No. 1 radio brand in the East Coast with 2.8 million weekly listeners by the GfK's Wave 2 Radio Audience Measurement (RAM). The rebranding on 1 January 2018 removed the "THR" name from Gegar, and the change also happened to Raaga.

From July 2018, Gegar broadcasts from 02:00 to 06:00 on Raaga's FM frequencies was discontinued, and the latter became 24 hours. Previously, 24 hour broadcasts of Raaga were only available through online and Astro channel 859.

Gegar's frequencies are only broadcast in the East Coast of Peninsular Malaysia and not in other states.

Frequency

Television satellite
 Astro (television): Channel 863

References

External links 
 

2005 establishments in Malaysia
Radio stations established in 2005
Radio stations in Malaysia
Malay-language radio stations